Roberta Vinci won the first edition of the tournament, defeating Petra Kvitová in the final, 7-6(2), 6–1.

Seeds

Draw

Finals

Top half

Bottom half

Qualifying

Seeds

Qualifiers

Lucky losers 
  Shahar Pe'er

Qualifying draw

First qualifier

Second qualifier

Third qualifier

Fourth qualifier

References 
 Main draw
 Qualifying draw

BNP Paribas Katowice Open - Singles
2013 Singles